Raymonde Le Texier (born 29 October 1939) is a member of the Senate of France, representing the Val-d'Oise department.  She is a member of the Socialist Party, and the vice president of the Commission of Social Affairs.

References
Page on the Senate website

1939 births
Living people
Socialist Party (France) politicians
French Senators of the Fifth Republic
Women members of the Senate (France)
Senators of Val-d'Oise